Discovery 2 may refer to:

 Land Rover Discovery 2, a first-generation Discovery SUV car model by Land Rover.
 Mars Pathfinder, the second mission of the Discovery Program.